Homogeneously staining regions (HSRs) are chromosomal segments with various lengths and uniform staining intensity after G banding. This type of aberration is also known as Copy Number Gains or Amplification.

An HSR is one type of change in a chromosome's structure which is frequently observed in the nucleus of human cancer cells. In the region of a chromosome where an HSR occurs, a segment of the chromosome, which presumably contains a gene or genes that give selective advantage to the progression of the cancer, is amplified or duplicated many times.  As a result of the duplication this chromosomal segment is greatly lengthened and expanded such that when it is stained with a fluorescent probe specific to the region (Fluorescent in situ hybridization), rather than causing a focal fluorescent signal as in a normal chromosome, the probe "paints" a broad fluorescent signal over the whole of the amplified region.  It is because of the appearance of this broadly staining region that this chromosomal abnormality was named a homogeneously staining region. The homogenously staining region was first observed in chromosome 2 by June Biedler  and Barbara Spengler in cells that had been made resistant to methotrexate.  The HSR was found to due to the amplification of the DHFR gene.

References
 
 An International System for Human Cytogenetic Nomenclature, Shaffer, L.G., Tommerup N. (eds); S. Karger, Basel 2005

Chromosomes
Cancer